This is page shows results of Canadian federal elections in the interior of British Columbia.

Regional profile
The BC Interior is a fairly conservative area today, although it has not always been that way. From the early days of the party to the early 1990s, this region was a New Democratic Party stronghold until its support throughout the entire province collapsed in 1993. From 1993 to 2000, the Reform and Canadian Alliance parties took over in a dramatic shift (widely seen as a protest vote against established parties), winning handily in nearly every riding. The Conservatives continued to hold most of the seats in 2004 (with one exception in the northwestern corner of the province).  While the NDP managed to take another seat in 2006, staunch divisions on social issues made it difficult for the NDP to make further gains. Some of the strongest conservative support is in Kelowna and the Okanagan, where a large number of retirees reside. For decades, the only close races in this region have been between the Conservatives and NDP. In the 2015 election, regional NDP strength allowed them to pick up a third seat, and in one of the biggest surprises of the election, the Liberals picked up their first seat in the BC Interior since 1974 in the region's most urban riding, Kelowna—Lake Country.

2015 - 42nd General Election

2011 - 41st General Election

2008 - 40th General Election

2006 - 39th General Election

2004 - 38th General Election

2000 - 37th General Election

Notes

References

Canadian federal election results in British Columbia